Fighting Fantasy: The Warlock of Firetop Mountain is a first person action RPG for the Nintendo DS developed by Big Blue Bubble and published by Aspyr in North America on November 25, 2009. The game is loosely based on the roleplaying gamebook of the same name.

Gameplay
As a first-person camera game, the player controls the character (an adventurer) in a combination of combat and puzzle game elements. The player typically has to navigate the character through a long series of tests, trials and mazes to reach goals. The end goal is to reach the evil warlock in his mountain fortress.

The character can roam freely through the environment, and uses a combination of skills, weapons, armour and magic. All are required to a degree to successfully complete the game.

Plot

The player takes the role of an adventurer on a quest to find the treasure of a powerful warlock, hidden deep within Firetop Mountain. The player must navigate the dungeons beneath Firetop Mountain, battle monsters and attempt to locate certain items necessary to completing the quest.

Reviews
Digital Chumps (Dec 27, 2009)
Gamer Limit (Dec 27, 2009)
IGN (Jan 05, 2010)
Mygamer.com (Jan 28, 2010)
RPGamer (Jan 24, 2010)
Destructoid (Dec 23, 2009)
GameSpot (Dec 16, 2009)
1UP (Nov 25, 2009)

References

External links
The game's page on GameSpot
Fighting Fantasy on Big Blue Bubble
Fighting Fantasy DS on FightingFantasy.com

2009 video games
Action role-playing video games
Fighting Fantasy
Nintendo DS games
Nintendo DS-only games
North America-exclusive video games
Single-player video games
Video games based on novels
Video games developed in Canada
Video games about witchcraft
Aspyr games
Big Blue Bubble games